Korek Airlines was an Iraqi charter airline based in Arbil, Iraq. The airline operated for only a month.

History

It was established in 2006 and commenced operations in April 2006 with a wet leased McDonnell Douglas MD-83 aircraft from MAP Jet, an Austrian airline. The airline ceased operations within a month and the aircraft was returned to the leasor on 26 May 2006.

Fleet
Korek Airlines operated a single wet leased McDonnell Douglas MD-83.

References

Defunct airlines of Iraq
Airlines established in 2006
Airlines disestablished in 2006
2006 disestablishments in Iraq
Defunct charter airlines
Iraqi companies established in 2006